Krupnik (Polish, Belarusian) or Krupnikas (Lithuanian) is a traditional sweet alcoholic drink similar to a liqueur, based on grain spirit (usually vodka) and honey, popular in Poland and Lithuania. In Poland it is grouped in the nalewka category of alcoholic beverages. Mass-produced versions of krupnik consist of 40–50% (80–100 proof) alcohol, but traditional versions will use 80–100% grain alcohol as the base.  Honey, usually clover honey, is the main ingredient used to add sweetness, as well as up to 50 different herbs.  There are many versions and some recipes have been passed down through generations; producers typically uses their own recipes.  

At times, spicy seasonings and herbs are added for flavour. The brand of the honey and the ratio of seasonings are key factors which determine the final taste of krupnik. A mixture of the honey and spices is diluted, boiled and strained before being added to a vodka base.
It may be served hot, at room temperature or chilled. A specific sort of krupnik which contains more herbs and less honey is brewed by Karaims.

"Krupnik" is also the brand name of a range of alcoholic beverages produced by the Belvédère company, including krupnik, vodka, and various nalewki. In 2014, Krupnik vodka was the eighth most popular vodka brand in the world by sales volume.

References

External links
 Krupnikas recipe on Recidemia

Herbal liqueurs
Honey liqueurs and spirits
Polish liqueurs
Polish vodkas